An eccrine nevus is an extremely rare cutaneous condition that, histologically, is characterized by an increase in size or number of eccrine secretory coils.

See also 
 Apocrine nevus
 Nevus comedonicus
 List of cutaneous conditions

References

External links 

 

Epidermal nevi, neoplasms, and cysts